Abrams Park is a  public park in Ridgefield, Washington, United States. The park features a playground, disc golf course, horseshoe pit, and picnic shelter called Bennett Hall, as well as fields for baseball, softball, soccer and volleyball.

References

External links
 

Parks in Clark County, Washington
Ridgefield, Washington